Masumi is a unisex Japanese given name. Notable people with the name include:

, Japanese hurdler
Masuumi Juma, a Japanese voice actor
Masumi Aya, a Japanese hammer thrower
Masumi Fuchise, a Japanese racewalker
Masumi Hayashi (disambiguation)
Masumi Itō, a Japanese singer and composer
Masumi Kuwata, a former Japanese right-handed pitcher
Masumi Mishina, a Japanese softball player
Masumi Mitsui, Japanese-Canadian veteran of World War I
Masumi Miyazaki, an actress
Masumi Okada, a professional actor, singer, stand-up comedian, and film producer
Masumi Oshima, Japanese writer
Masumi Uno, a Japanese watercolor painter
Sachiko Masumi (born 1984), Japanese long jumper

Fictional characters
 Masumi, the main character of Swan
 Masumi, a character in the manga version of Candy Boy
 Masumi Inou, in Search Guard Successor Foundation
 Masumi Nishijima, in Future Diary
 Masumi Sera, a character from Detective Conan
 Masumi Ageo, the character of Crayon Shin-Chan
 Masumi Usui (碓氷真澄), a character from the video game A3!

See also 
4293 Masumi, a main-belt asteroid

Japanese unisex given names